Tridepia is a genus of moths of the family Noctuidae.

Species
 Tridepia nova (Smith, 1903)

References
Natural History Museum Lepidoptera genus database
Tridepia at funet

Hadeninae